Dženan Uščuplić (born 18 August 1975) is a Bosnian professional football manager and former player.

Playing career
As a player of Sarajevo on three occasions, Uščuplić won 3 Bosnian cup titles and one supercup with the club. He also played for Olimpik. He retired in the summer of 2002 at the age of 27 because of a chronic knee injury sustained in April 1998.

Managerial career
After being forced to retire from football, Uščuplić spent 9 years in the Sarajevo youth academy and as an assistant to former first team manager Robert Jarni, before being named manager in 2014. In his debut season he led the club to a cup triumph, ending a seven-season silverware drought. On 26 September 2014, Uščuplić was relieved of his duties as Sarajevo manager after a string of disappointing results, and returned to the club's youth academy where he completed the UEFA Pro Licence program.

On 21 April 2015, he was again named manager of Sarajevo after the club management sacked Meho Kodro. This time Uščuplić led Sarajevo to a league triumph shortly after being named the new manager. On 11 September 2015, Uščuplić and his whole staff were sacked after a series of poor results that culminated with yet another loss, this time against Slavija Sarajevo.

Six years later, on 13 May 2021, he was yet again named as Sarajevo's caretaker manager until the end of the 2020–21 season, after the club agreed to terminate Vinko Marinović's contract by mutual agreement due to poor results in the last few games of the season. In Uščuplić's first game as manager, Sarajevo drew against Mladost Doboj Kakanj in a league game on 16 May 2021. He oversaw his first win as manager against Radnik Bijeljina on 23 May 2021. Three days later, on 26 May, Uščuplić led Sarajevo to yet another Bosnian cup triumph, this time beating Borac Banja Luka in the final.

On 12 May 2022, for a second time in a year, he became Sarajevo's caretaker manager until the end of the 2021–22 season, following Aleksandar Vasoski's resignation. Sarajevo ended the season in 4th place and lost to Velež Mostar in the 2021–22 Bosnian Cup final, failing to qualify to a European competition for a second time in six years.

Managerial statistics

Honours

Player
Sarajevo 
Bosnian Cup: 1996–97, 1997–98, 2001–02
Bosnian Supercup: 1997

Manager
Sarajevo 
Bosnian Premier League: 2014–15
Bosnian Cup: 2013–14, 2020–21

References

External links

Dženan Uščuplić at football database

1975 births
Living people
Footballers from Sarajevo
Bosniaks of Bosnia and Herzegovina
Bosnia and Herzegovina footballers
Bosnia and Herzegovina under-21 international footballers
Premier League of Bosnia and Herzegovina players
FK Sarajevo players
FK Olimpik players
Association football midfielders
Bosnia and Herzegovina football managers
Premier League of Bosnia and Herzegovina managers
FK Sarajevo managers